Indians is the moniker and alter ego of Danish singer-songwriter and musician Søren Løkke Juul signed to 4AD record label. In concerts, he is accompanied by some musicians also collectively known as Indians. Village Voice has dubbed Søren Løkke Juul / Indians as "Denmark's Bon Iver"

Performing his first solo show with the moniker Indians in February 2012, he self-released his debut single on 7" a few months later. He also extensively toured Europe and North America with the likes of Other Lives, Beirut, Perfume Genius, Phosphorescent and Daughter. He was eventually signed to British well-known indie record label 4AD with his debut album Somewhere Else released in Europe on 28 January 2013 and in North America the following day. The album charted in his home country in February 2013. He also had a song "Oblivion" featured on The Fault in Our Stars (soundtrack).

Discography

Albums

Singles
2012: "I Am Haunted"

References

External links
4AD Indians page

Danish male singers
Danish songwriters
Living people
Year of birth missing (living people)